Ceratoglyphina bambusae, is an aphid in the superfamily Aphidoidea in the order Hemiptera. It is a true bug and sucks sap from plants.

References 

 http://animaldiversity.org/accounts/Ceratoglyphina_bambusae/classification/
 http://www.nbair.res.in/Aphids/Ceratoglyphina-bambusae.php
 http://aphid.speciesfile.org/Common/basic/Taxa.aspx?TaxonNameID=1162525
 https://web.archive.org/web/20150402181308/https://www.princeton.edu/~dstern/papers/Aoki.1991.AnimBehav.pdf

Hormaphidinae
Agricultural pest insects